Tuzlamakhi (Dargwa: ТIузламахьи) is a rural locality (a selo) in Natsinsky Selsoviet, Akushinsky District, Republic of Dagestan, Russia. The population was 179 as of 2010. There are 5 streets.

Geography 
Tuzlamakhi is located 33 km south of Akusha (the district's administrative centre) by road. Natsi is the nearest rural locality.

References 

Rural localities in Akushinsky District